Germany competed at the 2015 World Championships in Athletics in Beijing, China, from 22–30 August 2015.

Medalists

Results

Men
Track and road events

Field events

Combined events – Decathlon

Women
Track and road events

Field events

Combined events – Heptathlon

References

2015
Nations at the 2015 World Championships in Athletics
World Championships in Athletics